The official opposition in India includes the Leader of the Opposition in Lok Sabha, the Leader of the Opposition in Rajya Sabha and the current opposition leaders in the legislative assemblies and legislative councils of the Indian states and union territories.

Parliament of India
This is the list of current opposition leaders in the Parliament of India:

Legislatures of the States and Union territories

State Legislative Assemblies
This is the list of current opposition leaders in the legislative assemblies of the Indian states and union territories:

State Legislative Councils
This is the list of current opposition leaders in the legislative councils of the Indian states:

See also
 List of current Indian governors
 List of current Indian chief ministers
 List of current Indian chief justices
 List of current Indian legislative speakers and chairpersons
 List of current Indian ruling and opposition parties
 Leader of the Opposition in Lok Sabha
 Leader of the Opposition in Rajya Sabha
 Official Opposition

References

 
O
 
Lists of leaders of the Opposition